Helen Jane Long (born 10 April 1974) is a British composer, musician and pianist, best known for various advertisement contracts, her work on several film projects in a variety of genres, and, most recently, her contemporary-classic piano albums, Embers (2010) (BLE) and Porcelain (Warner Music Group). In 2003, Long worked as music assistant to Howard Shore on the film score for The Lord of the Rings trilogy. Long composed the original music for the movie thrillers The Only Hotel and Surveillance 24/7. As the World's highest streaming female pianist, Long's songs have been streamed more than one billion times.

Early life, education
Long was born on 10 April 1974 in Hampshire, England. She began training as a classical pianist at age 4, moving on to also learn clarinet, guitar, cello, vocals, organ, and violin.

Long began composing when she entered college. However, frustrated with the progression of her music degree, she claims she spent her entire student loan on a huge sequencer keyboard. She then slowly continued to amass the equipment needed for a fully operational home recording studio. There she independently practised recording, producing, scoring, arranging, and mixing.

Career
After college Long began working for the BBC on the children's shows Blue Peter and Live & Kicking, where she periodically worked with Ronnie Hazlehurst (composer for Only Fools and Horses), Dennis King of Black Beauty, and Nigel Hess (composer of the film Ladies in Lavender). She has also worked with composers Jerry Goldsmith and Ron Goodwin. She was signed to a major label soon after sending out demos of her material. Long has since written scores, piano pieces, and full orchestrations for many films and television spots.

In 2003 Long served as a music score assistant for composer Howard Shore on the historic film trilogy The Lord of the Rings, as well as the extended DVDs. Long, who had met Shore before the films, served essentially as his personal copy editor for the sheet music he wrote daily for new scenes. She was also known on set for reliably supplying brownies and pancakes.

She is well known for scoring the often played Volkswagen Passat commercials in 2005. Since 2005 she has scored a large amount of for-television documentaries on Channel 4, Channel 5, the Discovery Channel, and the BBC, including Behind the Da Vinci Code and Open Gardens in 2008. She has also scored several short films and the feature films The Only Hotel and Surveillance (2007). She has done several recordings with the Royal Philharmonic Orchestra, notably in 2007 when she worked with them to compose and record a music CD of orchestral music.

Solo Releases
Porcelain (2007)
Long released her debut album Porcelain on 24 July 2007 on Warner Classics. The album is a collection of original piano compositions, many in a classically expressive and filmic style. Besides Long on piano, the recording sessions also included musicians Jonathan Hill and Nick Holland. The cello used in the recordings was handmade by Long's father. As of 1 February 2010, Porcelain was the top selling album on America's largest classical radio station, and she secured a sell-out tour of the United States.

On 3 May 2010 Long released her second piano album Embers with BLE Music Group. The album quickly became widely requested on worldwide classical radio stations, and was "most requested" on Classic FM radio.

Intervention (2012)

Identity (2016)

Perspective (2018)

Awards
Long was Radio Classic FM's Guest List Composer in 2007. She was also selected as Audio Network's Composer of the Month for February 2010.

Personal life
Helen Long lives in the south east of the United Kingdom, where she is an avid water-skier and triathlete.

Discography

Scoring history

Feature Films
 The Only Hotel – (Globocine, 2003)
 Surveillance 24/7 – (2007)
 Tout Le Mond En Parfait – (Canadian Films, 2007)
 Los Testigos De La Guerra – (2007)
Finding Fatima (2010) – stock music

Adverts
 NSPCC – (2000)
 Galaxy Chocolate – (2004)
 Disney Princess – (2006)
 VW Passat – (2007)
 Bosch – (2007)
 Aviator - (2011) British Airways: To Fly, To Serve 
 The F Word – (Channel 4, 2006)

Documentaries
 Road to Berlin – (Discovery, 2005)
 The F Word – (Channel 4, 2006)
 Fifth Gear – (Channel 5, 2006)
 The Hotel Inspector – (Channel 5, 2006)
 Face of Britain – (Channel 4, 2007)
 The Insider – (Channel 4, 2007)
 Behind The Da Vinci Code – (USA TV, 2008)
 Dispatches – (Channel 4, 2008)
 Open Gardens – (BBC, 2008)
 Sport Relief – (BBC, 2008)
 Storms of War –  (Discovery, 2008)

Short Films
 Out in the Cold – (Marchmont, 2005)
 Save the World – (David Casals, 2007)
 Asphyxia – (2008)
 Unlikely Maestro – (2012)
 '' – (2012)
 Weekend DadTelevision
BAFTA Awards

Commercials
 Mercedes – 2004
Galaxy Chocolate – 2005
Volkswagen Passat – 2005
National Express – 2006
 Bosch – 2008
British Airways – 2011

MiscellaniesFrog from the Website Pottermore

AlbumsPorcelain (2007)Embers (2010)Intervention (2012)Identity (2016)Live at St. James's, London (2016)Perspective (2018)Vessel of Light (2020)Disconnect'' (2022)

References

Further reading
Interview on Classic FM (UK access only)

External links

Helen Jane Long on Facebook
Helen Jane Long on Blogger

Music samples
Helen Jane Long on iTunes
Helen Jane Long on Last.fm
Helen Jane Long on Pandora
Porcelain at Barnes & Noble

British women composers
Living people
1974 births
British classical composers
British classical pianists
British women pianists
21st-century classical pianists
21st-century women pianists